10Love  is the tenth album by J-Pop artist Mayumi Izuka. It was released on September 27, 2006. This album was composed by ten people including HoshiMai (星舞), the pen name of Mayumi Iizuka.

Track listing

References

2006 albums
Mayumi Iizuka albums
Japanese-language albums
Tokuma Shoten albums